"Nothing Short of Dying" is a song written and recorded by American country music artist Travis Tritt.  It was released in February 1992 as the fourth and final single from Tritt's album It's All About to Change.  It peaked at number 4 on the Billboard country music chart in the United States, and at number 7 on the country singles chart in Canada.

Personnel
Compiled from liner notes.

 Sam Bacco — marimba, maracas
 Richard Bennett — electric guitar
 Mike Brignardello — bass guitar
 Larry Byrom — acoustic guitar
 Terry Crisp — steel guitar
 Stuart Duncan — fiddle
 Chris Leuzinger — acoustic guitar, Dobro
 Hargus "Pig" Robbins — piano
 Steve Turner — drums
 Billy Joe Walker Jr. — acoustic guitar
 Dennis Wilson — background vocals
 Curtis Young — background vocals
 Reggie Young — electric guitar

Chart positions
"Nothing Short of Dying" debuted on the U.S. Billboard Hot Country Singles & Tracks for the week of March 7, 1992.

Year-end charts

References

Travis Tritt songs
1992 singles
Songs written by Travis Tritt
Warner Records singles
1991 songs